Vitrinellidae is a family of very small and minute sea snails with an operculum, marine gastropod mollusks in the superfamily Truncatelloidea.

Genera
 Carinatus Rubio & Rolán, 2020
 Circulus Jeffreys, 1865
 Collatus Rubio & Rolán, 2019
 Monodosus Rubio & Rolán, 2016
 Pseudoliotia Tate, 1898
 † Rotellorbis Cossmann, 1888
 Vitrinella C. B. Adams, 1850 
Genera brought into synonymy
 Discreliotia Laseron, 1958: synonym of Pseudoliotia Tate, 1898
 Liochrysta Laseron, 1958: synonym of Pseudoliotia Tate, 1898
 Morchinella [sic]: synonym of Moerchinella Thiele, 1931: synonym of Moerchia A. Adams, 1860 (misspelling)
 Soyorota Habe, 1961: synonym of Circulus Jeffreys, 1865
 Subfamily Vitrinellinae Bush, 1897: synonym of Vitrinellidae Bush, 1897

References

 Jensen, R. H. (1997). A Checklist and Bibliography of the Marine Molluscs of Bermuda. Unp. , 547 pp
 Bouchet P., Rocroi J.P., Hausdorf B., Kaim A., Kano Y., Nützel A., Parkhaev P., Schrödl M. & Strong E.E. (2017). Revised classification, nomenclator and typification of gastropod and monoplacophoran families. Malacologia. 61(1-2): 1-526.